The Drift Creek Bridge is a covered bridge in Lincoln County in the U.S. state of Oregon. Built in 1914, the structure originally carried Drift Creek County Road over Drift Creek. The creek flows into Siletz Bay of the Pacific Ocean south of Lincoln City.

Newer bridges later carried most of the north–south traffic and, after a concrete bridge bypassed the Drift Creek Bridge in the 1960s, Lincoln County preserved it as a pedestrian crossing and a monument to 19th-century pioneers. In 1988, however, county officials closed the bridge entirely after rot and insect damage made the structure unsafe.

In 2000, the Sweitz family rebuilt the bridge over Bear Creek and granted a permanent public easement at that site. Bear Creek is a tributary of the Salmon River, which it enters near Rose Lodge.

The original Howe truss bridge had board-and-batten siding, arched portals, and ribbon windows along the eaves. Before being dismantled, it was the closest covered bridge to the Oregon Coast. The bridge was added to the National Register of Historic Places in 1979 and removed in 1998.

See also
List of bridges documented by the Historic American Engineering Record in Oregon
List of bridges on the National Register of Historic Places in Oregon
List of Oregon covered bridges

References

External links

Bridges completed in 1914
Bridges in Lincoln County, Oregon
Covered bridges on the National Register of Historic Places in Oregon
Pedestrian bridges in Oregon
Wooden bridges in Oregon
Tourist attractions in Lincoln County, Oregon
Historic American Engineering Record in Oregon
National Register of Historic Places in Lincoln County, Oregon
Road bridges on the National Register of Historic Places in Oregon
Former road bridges in the United States
Howe truss bridges in the United States
1914 establishments in Oregon